All Assamese Students' Association or AASA is a students' organisation for the students of Assam studying in Delhi. They have been organising various events and activities to hold and safeguard the culture and tradition of Assam in the Capital of India and adjacent regions.

Help Desk 
All Assamese Students' Association organises Annual Admission Help Desk in various cities of Assam along with telephonic support. These help desks are run by students who are currently studying in the University of Delhi  and other colleges of NCR to help students of Assam in the admission process of their colleges.

Every year thousands of students get help in their admission and other necessary requirements through this help desk.

Frestival 
Frestival is an Annual event organised by All Assamese Students' Association, New Delhi to welcome the fresher students from Assam. It usually happen between August–September. They invite artists like the local train, Neel akash to entertain students.

Bohagi Utsav 
Bohagi Utsav is a celebration of Assamese new year Bohag Bihu, All Assamese Students' Association organizes Bohagi Utsav annually with the participation of many Assamese people staying in Delhi. Many popular artists like Zubeen Garg, Deeplina Deka, Amrita Gogoi had performed in the event.

Mamoni Raisom Goswami Memorial National Debate 
The Mamoni Raisom Goswami Memorial National Debate Competition is organized every year By AASA, ND in memory of literateur Dr. Indira Goswami.

Other Activities 
All Assamese Students' Association also organise various events like Health Camp for slum children, Children's Day in Slum areas, Motivational Talk Session, Career Counseling Sessions, Saraswati Puja, Annual Sports Day etc. All Assamese students' Association always been raising their voice for Assam. They participated in the Anti CAA Protests in Delhi; they initiated various fund raisers in critical times like Flood in Assam, Covid -19 Scare.

Pratidhwani 
Pratidhwani, literally meaning 'echo', is the annual magazine of the All Assamese Students' Association, New Delhi. It compiles the plethora of art from a wide range of contributors and serves as an account of one whole year's achievement as well as growth of the Association.

See also 

 All Assam Students' Union
 Bohag Bihu

External links 

 Facebook

References